Nathan Murphy may refer to:

 Nathan Oakes Murphy (1849–1908), governor of Arizona Territory
 Nathan Murphy (Australian politician) (born 1977), member of the Victorian Legislative Council in 2010
 Nathan Murphy (footballer) (born 1999), Australian rules footballer for Collingwood